The 2012 Memphis Tigers football team represented the University of Memphis in the 2012 NCAA Division I FBS football season. The Tigers were led by first year head coach Justin Fuente and played their home games at the Liberty Bowl Memorial Stadium in Memphis, Tennessee. They played in their final season as a member East Division of Conference USA in 2012 and moved to the Big East Conference in 2013. They finished the season 4–8, 4–4 in C-USA play to finish in a tie for third place in the East Division.

Schedule

Game summaries

Tennessee–Martin

@ Arkansas State

Middle Tennessee

@ Duke

Rice

@ East Carolina

UCF

@ SMU

@ Marshall

Tulane

@ UAB

Southern Miss

References

Memphis
Memphis Tigers football seasons
Memphis Tigers football